Yuseong District (Yuseong-gu) is a gu ("district") of Daejeon, South Korea, known for high tech industries, Daejeon Expo '93, Daedeok Science Town and the Yuseong Special Tourism District. Daejeon Islamic Center is also located in Kung-dong, Yuseong-gu. The Science Town is the core of the International Science and Business Belt.

History
Yuseong first started its spa business in 1913, and by the 1970s, major developments were made, adding 12 more hotels to the area, leading this area to be designated first as the Special Spa District in 1981 and finally as the Yuseong Special Tourism District by August 31, 1994.

To prevent centralization in Seoul, then-President Park Chung Hee concentrated the country's high tech industries in the Daedeok Science Town in the 1970s and the Expo '93 was held here. The area is in process of expanding into the International Science and Business Belt.

Tourism and technology
Since the time of the Baekje Kingdom, travellers have visited Yuseong's natural springs and spas. This ultimately resulted in the creation of the Yuseong Special Tourism District. The majority of the hotels in Daejeon are situated in this area, and it is one of the commercial centers of Daejeon Metropolitan City. Some important sight seeing places are the Daejeon National Cemetery, Geological Museum, Currency Museum of Korea, Natural History Museum, Daejeon Prehistory Museum, Asia Museum, Yeojin Gallery, and Daejeon Museum of Art. Science-oriented attractions include National Science Museum, Daejeon Space Observatory, Daedeok Science Town, and Daejeon Institute of Education & Science.

Parks include Expo Science Park and Kumdori Land. Cultural centers include Mokwon University Daedeok Science Culture Center, Jeongsimhwa International Culture Center, Expo Art Hall, Suwungyo Cheondan, Ahnsansanseong (Fortress), Jimjam Confucian School, and Ssunghyeon Ancient Lecture Hall.

Neighborhoods (Dong) of Yuseong

Jinjam-dong
Seongbuk-dong
Se-dong
Songjeong-dong
Wonnae-dong
Bang-dong
Gyochon-dong
Daejeong-dong
Yonggye-dong
Hakha-dong
Gyesan-dong
Wonsinheung-dong
Wonsinheung-dong
Sangdae-dong
Bongmyeong-dong(Partly)
Oncheon 1-dong
Bongmyeong-dong(Partly)
Guam-dong
Deogmyeong-dong
Bongnyong-dong
Oncheon 2-dong
Jangdae-dong(Partly)
Juk-dong(Partly)
Gung-dong
Eoeun-dong
Guseong-dong
Noeun-dong(Partly)
Noeun 1-dong
Gap-dong
Noeun-dong(Partly)
Jijok-dong(Partly)
Juk-dong(Partly)
Jangdae-dong(Partly)
Noeun 2-dong
Hagi-dong(Partly)
Sunam-dong
Ansan-dong
Oesam-dong
Banseok-dong(Partly)
Juk-dong(Partly)
Jijok-dong(Partly)
Noeun 3-dong
Jijok-dong(Partly)
Banseok-dong(Partly)
Sinseong-dong
Jeonmin-dong
Gujeuk-dong
Gwanpyeong-dong

Plans
Plans have been made to renovate and develop the areas to attract more tourists. The major project that is currently proposed and evaluated is the Yuseong Leisure Town. Water theme parks, spa resorts, public golf course, and various other attractions will be constructed.

Science
Daedeok Science Park in Yuseong-gu is Korea's top research area, hosting multiple public and private research groups and organizations. Government funded research groups include the following. 

Agency for Defense Development
Central Research Institute (중앙연구원), Korea Hydro & Nuclear Power
Central Branch Office (중부분소), National Forensic Service
Electronics and Telecommunications Research Institute
Institute for Basic Science
International Intellectual Property Training Institute
KAIST
KEPCO Research Institute, Korea Electric Power Corporation
Korea Aerospace Research Institute
Korea Astronomy and Space Science Institute
Korea Atomic Energy Research Institute
Korea Basic Science Institute
Korea Evaluation Institute of Industrial Technology
Korea Institute of Energy Research
Korea Institute of Geoscience and Mineral Resources
Korea Institute of Machinery & Materials
Korea Institute of Nuclear Nonproliferation and Control
Korea Institute of Nuclear Safety
Korea Institute of Oriental Medicine
Korea Institute of R&D Human Resource Development
Korea Institute of Science and Technology Information
Korea Research Institute of Bioscience and Biotechnology
Korea Research Institute of Chemical Technology
Korea Research Institute of Standards and Science
National Fusion Research Institute
National Institute for Mathematical Sciences
National NanoFab Center
National Research Foundation of Korea
National Research Institute of Cultural Heritage
National Security Research Institute
National Urban Research Institute (국토도시연구원), Korea Land and Housing Corporation
Research Institute of Water Resources (수자원연구원), K-water
Ship & Offshore Plant Research Institute (선박해양플랜트연구소), Korea Institute of Ocean Science & Technology

References

External links
Yuseong-gu website